A mathematician is a scholar in the fields of mathematics. They solve and research mathematical problems which can be applied in real life or completely abstract (pure). This article covers notable mathematicians from Norway.

A pioneer of modern mathematics, Niels Henrik Abel contributed greatly towards various fields of mathematics during his short life. He died in 1829, aged 26, from tuberculosis. German mathematician Felix Klein spoke of his reluctance "to part from this ideal type of researcher". In 2001, the Abel Prize was established in his honour.

Other notable mathematicians include (in alphabetical order) Carl Anton Bjerknes, Vilhelm Bjerknes, Bernt Michael Holmboe, who is known for being Abel's teacher and tutor, Sophus Lie, Idun Reiten, Atle Selberg, Thoralf Skolem and Carl Størmer.

Alphabetical order
"Aa" appears under "å" as they are considered different representations of the same letter.

See also
Archiv for Mathematik og Naturvidenskab
Bjerknes (lunar crater)
Bjerknes (Martian crater)
List of things named after Niels Henrik Abel
Abel Prize
Selberg class
Weather forecasting
Aanderaa–Karp–Rosenberg conjecture

Notes

References

External links
Abel Prize 

Norwegian mathematicians
Mathematics-related lists
Lists of people by occupation and nationality